Anne Gilchrist may refer to:

Anne Gilchrist (writer) (1828–1885), English writer 
Anne Gilchrist (collector) (1863–1954), British folk-song collector

See also
 Annie Somers Gilchrist (1841–1912), American writer